Crush, Crumble and Chomp! is a 1981 video game where the player takes control of a movie monster and attacks a major city, such as New York or San Francisco. It was published in 1981 for the TRS-80, Apple II, and Atari 8-bit family. Ports to the VIC-20, Commodore 64, and DOS were released later. Some versions were published under the company's original name of Automated Simulations, while the rest use Epyx.

Gameplay

Crush, Crumble and Chomp! is a turn-based action game played on a scrolling 2D grid-based map.

The player creates a movie monster and attacks a city, much in the manner of the classic horror movies of the 1950s. Specifically, the player can create:
 Goshilla, a giant amphibian like Godzilla, with a breath weapon and leaving a corrosive trail of radioactive waste. 
 The Kraken, a giant octopus or squid-like monster, that can attack bridges and seaside ports and then slip into the water to hide from attack. However, the Kraken can not go on land.
 Arachnis, a giant spider, can clog roads with its web and can escape underground via its network of secret tunnels. Arachnis can tunnel underwater, but if emerging in water it's trapped, can't move, and needs to tunnel back to dry land.
 The Glob, akin to the monster in The Blob, can travel underground in the city's sewer and absorb obstacles in its path, including skyscrapers. It also leaves a flammable trail of slime in its wake. The Glob shares Arachnis' tunneling ability, but also its limitation.
 Mechismo, a towering robotic menace, sports an exotic array of alien weaponry, such as ray guns.  It has the advantage over the other monsters in that it does not need to capture and eat people to survive. This is countered by the fact that, as a non-lifeform, it can't heal; the game's customization could allow the player to build a self-repairing robot, but this requires a prohibitive amount of "crunch credits".
 Mantra, a giant flying monster, like the infamous Rodan. Mantra can fly over water, but, if landing in it, is stuck like Arachnis or The Glob emerging from its tunneling.

The game also allows the player to "grow" their own monster, with several basic shapes to choose from and a number of "crunch credits" to spend on custom abilities. The number of credits available, and the cost of some abilities, depends on the shape chosen. The player can add a number of abilities until their credits are exhausted.

Crush, Crumble and Chomp! has four cities to attack: San Francisco, New York, Washington, D.C. and Tokyo. After attacking a city—the main activity of the game—players are rated on how well they did. Players are rated even if their monsters die in the attack and can achieve a high score for what they accomplished before expiring.

Development
The game engine is in BASIC and uses character graphics for the map and player, using basic graphics on platforms that support it. On the Atari 8-bit family, for instance, the map is created out of a custom character set and presented in a low-resolution mode that allows up to four colors. The same engine was used in most of Epyx's games from the early 1980s.

Reception
Stanley Greenlaw reviewed the game for Computer Gaming World, and stated that "If you have enjoyed other Automated Simulation games you will not be disappointed in this one. It has the traditional Automated Simulation game mechanics, improved graphics, and a highly entertaining theme."

The game was reviewed in 1982 in The Dragon #65 by Bruce Humphrey. Humphrey concluded that "The game system isn't perfect, from the player/monster point of view," but "The game is satisfying, however, from a fun-to-play standpoint, and that counts more." Jerry Pournelle stated that he was "particularly partial" to Crush in BYTE in 1983. He called it "my all-time favorite" in 1984, writing "there's something exceedingly attractive about burning down and stomping the Pentagon flat, and in general making an even bigger mess of Washington than the politicians have".

Steve Loniewski reviewed Crush, Crumble and Chomp in Ares Magazine #14 and commented that "Crush, Crumble and Chomp is a fine, well thought-out game that ought to keep our subdued destructive impulses at bay for one more evening."

Legacy
Epyx released a similar game in 1986 as The Movie Monster Game.

References

External links
Crush, Crumble, and Chomp at Atari Mania
Review in 80 Micro
Review in 80-U.S.

1981 video games
Apple II games
Atari 8-bit family games
Commodore 64 games
VIC-20 games
DOS games
Epyx games
Kaiju video games
TRS-80 games
Video games developed in the United States
Single-player video games